Edwin Roxburgh (born 1937) is an English composer, conductor and oboist.

Roxburgh was born in Liverpool.  After playing oboe in the National Youth Orchestra, he won a double scholarship to study composition with Herbert Howells and oboe with Terence MacDonagh at the Royal College of Music. He also studied composition with Nadia Boulanger in Paris and Luigi Dallapiccola in Florence.

After his studies he became principal oboist of the Sadler's Wells Opera and taught composition and conducting at the Royal College of Music, where he founded the RCM's Twentieth Century Ensemble. Together with Leon Goossens he wrote the Menuhin Music Guide for the oboe in 1977.

In 2004, Roxburgh became the acting Head of Composition at the Birmingham Conservatoire and from 2005 has acted as visiting tutor in composition and conducting, as well as workshop leader. In 2007 his 70th birthday was celebrated in a series of concert performances showcasing a selection of his works. In 2008 he received the Royal Philharmonic Society Elgar Bursary.

He is also Associate Composer of the London Festival Orchestra.

Music
The orchestral piece Montage was premiered at the BBC Proms in 1977. His Clarinet Concerto (1995), structured as a 30 minute single movement, and the nine movement orchestral work Saturn from 1982 (a tribute to Holst, depicting each of the planet’s nine satellites) have been recorded. His 2003 opera Abelard has been published but awaits a full staging. The 2006 Oboe Concerto, An Elegy for Ur, won a British Academy Award. An opera, Her War, for soprano and trumpet with words by Jonathan Ruffle, was premiered by soprano April Fredrick and trumpeter Simon Desbruslais in London in September 2020.

Further reading
Edwin Roxburgh (2014) "Conducting for a New Era". London: Boydell & Brewer/Boydell & Brewer Ltd.

References

 The Guardian review
 Music Web review
 Gramophone review
 Full reviews archived by Metier
 Royal Philharmonic Society Elgar Bursary

External links
 UMP composers site bio & list of compositions
 Birmingham Conservatoire biography

1937 births
Living people
20th-century classical composers
21st-century classical composers
English classical composers
English classical oboists
Male oboists
Alumni of the Royal College of Music
Musicians from Liverpool
English male classical composers
20th-century English composers
21st-century English composers
20th-century British male musicians
21st-century British male musicians